Sara McManus (born 14 August 1993) is a Canadian field hockey player.

Personal life
Sara McManus was born and raised in Tsawwassen, British Columbia. She studied kinesiology at the University of British Columbia.

McManus is sponsored by Ritual Hockey.

Career

Under–21
McManus made her debut for the Canada U–21 in 2012 at the Pan American Junior Championship in Guadalajara.

In 2013, she captained the team at the FIH Junior World Cup in Mönchengladbach.

National team
McManus made her debut for the national team in 2011.

Throughout her career, McManus has medalled multiple times. She won bronze and silver medals at the 2015 and 2019 editions of the Pan American Games, respectively. She has also won bronze twice at the 2013 and 2022 Pan American Cups.

She also represented Canada at the XX and XXI Commonwealth Games.

References

External links

1993 births
Living people
Canadian female field hockey players
Female field hockey defenders
Pan American Games medalists in field hockey
Pan American Games silver medalists for Canada
Pan American Games bronze medalists for Canada
Field hockey players at the 2015 Pan American Games
Field hockey players at the 2019 Pan American Games
Medalists at the 2015 Pan American Games
Medalists at the 2019 Pan American Games
Field hockey players at the 2022 Commonwealth Games